General Sir Garry Dene Johnson KCB OBE MC (born 20 September 1937) was Commander-in-Chief of Allied Forces Northern Europe.

Military career
Garry Johnson was commissioned into the 10th Princess Mary's Own Gurkha Rifles in 1956. He served in Malaysia during the Malaysian Emergency. In 1981 he was made Commander of 11th Armoured Brigade.

In 1985 he was selected to be Assistant Chief of Defence Staff. He moved on to be Commander of British Forces in Hong Kong in 1987 before being appointed Commander for Training and Arms Directors in 1989.

In 1992 he became Commander-in-Chief Allied Forces Northern Europe and retired in 1994.

He was Regimental Colonel of the 10th Princess Mary's Own Gurkha Rifles from 1985 to 1994.

Johnson has been awarded the Pingat Jasa Malaysia Medal by the King and Government of Malaysia, the Order of the Cross of Terra Mariana of Estonia and, in 1999, the Order of the Three Stars 3rd Class of Latvia.

References

|-

1937 births
Knights Commander of the Order of the Bath
Officers of the Order of the British Empire
Recipients of the Military Cross
British Army generals
British Army personnel of the Malayan Emergency
Royal Gurkha Rifles officers
Living people
Recipients of the Order of the Cross of Terra Mariana, 1st Class